The Grob Strato 2C was a German experimental high altitude research aircraft. Powered by two turbocharged piston engines and featuring an extremely long span wing of composite construction, one aircraft was built in the 1990s, but was abandoned despite setting a world altitude record for piston-engined aircraft on its last flight.

Development and design
In April 1992, the German Aerospace Center (Deutsches Zentrum für Luft- und Raumfahrt e.V - DLR) commenced a programme to develop an aircraft to carry out atmospheric, stratospheric and climatic research.  It chose Grob Aerospace to design and build an aircraft to meet these requirements, based both on its experience in use of composite material in aircraft structures together with its successful development of the Egrett surveillance aircraft, with the aircraft expected to be operational by 1996.

In order to meet the requirement to operate at an altitude of 24,000 m (78,700 ft) for 48 hours, Grob designed a twin-engined aircraft with a straight, very high aspect ratio wing of 56.5 m (185 ft 4½ in) span. The wings featured winglets, and were mounted across the top of the fuselage which terminated in a T-tail configuration. The aircraft was designed to be crewed by two pilots, and could accommodate two scientists and associated mission equipment in a pressurised cabin. A galley, rest facilities and a toilet were provided.

Unlike the Egrett, which was powered by a single turboprop engine, the Strato was powered by two wing-mounted pusher compound engines consisting of a turbocharged piston engine with the Gas Generator from a PW127 turboprop engine to provide a constant supply of pressurised air to the piston engine at high altitude. This had the advantage of maintaining power at high altitudes. Each engine drove a 6 m (19 ft 8 in) diameter five-bladed propeller.

Construction of the airframe moulds started mid-November 1992, with airframe construction beginning in April the following year, starting with the tailplane. The airframe was completed in 1994 and engine installation commenced.

Operational history
The prototype first flew on 31 March 1995. Costs overran, however, and the prototype, which was intended as a Proof of Concept aircraft with off the shelf equipment and a heavier wing structure than planned for the production aircraft, was late and did not deliver the expected performance. Despite setting a world altitude record for manned piston-engined aircraft of 18,552 m (60,897 ft) on 4 August 1995, on its 29th and what turned out to be final flight, the programme was cancelled by the DLR in 1996.

Specifications (Strato 2C)

See also

References
Estimated performance.

Bibliography

 Bents David J.,  Mockler, Ted, Maldonado, Jaime,  Harp, James L.Jr.,  King, Joseph F. and   Schmitz. Paul C. Propulsion System for Very High Altitude Subsonic Unmanned Aircraft . NASA/TM—1998-206636. Cleveland, Ohio: NASA Lewis Research Centre, April 1998
Galleithner, Hans. "High Altitude Research Aircraft as Further Examples of the Application of the Fibre Composite Technology". Aeronautical Research in Germany: From Lilienthal Until Today . Ernst-Heinrich Hirschel, Horst Prem, Gero Madelung. New York: Springer-Verlag, 2004. .
Jeziorski, Andrzej. "Strato 2C takes flight but funds stay low". Flight International. 12–18 April 1995.
Jeziorski, Andrzej. "High and Dry". Flight International. 31 January - 6 February 1996. pp. 66–67.
Jeziorski, Andrzej. "DLR cancels Strato 2C contract". Flight International. 10–16 July 1996, p. 4.
Taylor, M.J.H. Brassey's World Aircraft & Systems Directory: 1995/1997 Edition. London: Brassey's, 1996. .
Taylor, M.J.H. Brassey's World Aircraft & Systems Directory: 1999/2000 Edition. London: Brassey's, 1999. .

External links

Homepage of Grob Aircraft
flug-revue
Spyflight
MT-Propeller
DLR - Institut für Flugsystemtechnik - History – Road Map of Events: 1992-1994

1990s German experimental aircraft
Grob aircraft
Twin-engined pusher aircraft
Aircraft first flown in 1995
High-wing aircraft